Rolf Mørck Stigersand (7 December 1916 – 21 June 2006) was a Norwegian sports diver. He was born in Kristiania, Norway. He competed at the 1948 Summer Olympics in London, where he placed ninth in 10 metre platform.

References

External links

1916 births
2006 deaths
Sportspeople from Oslo
Norwegian male divers
Olympic divers of Norway
Divers at the 1948 Summer Olympics